Phytobius is a genus of beetles belonging to the family Curculionidae.

Species:
 Phytobius leucogaster

References

Curculionidae
Curculionidae genera